Patrick Mascarenhas (born 7 December 1953 in Rio de Janeiro) is a Brazilian sailor who competed in the 1972 Summer Olympics.

References

1953 births
Living people
Brazilian male sailors (sport)
Olympic sailors of Brazil
Sailors at the 1972 Summer Olympics – Soling
Sportspeople from Rio de Janeiro (city)